Patriarch Theodore may refer to:

 Theodore I of Constantinople, Ecumenical Patriarch in 677–679
 Patriarch Theodore I of Alexandria, Greek Patriarch of Alexandria in 607–609
 Patriarch Theodore II of Alexandria (Coadjutor), Greek Patriarch of Alexandria between the 7th and 8th centuries
 Theodore II of Constantinople, Ecumenical Patriarch in 1214–1216
 Patriarch Theodore II of Alexandria, Greek Patriarch of Alexandria since 2004